Mu Xia (born April 28, 1974) is a female Chinese softball player who competed at the 2000 Summer Olympics and at the 2004 Summer Olympics. She was born in Tianjin. In the 2000 Olympic softball competition she finished fourth with the Chinese team. She played all eight matches as outfielder. Four years later she finished fourth again with the Chinese team in the 2004 Olympic softball tournament. She played all eight matches as outfielder again.

References

External links
profile

1974 births
Living people
Chinese softball players
Olympic softball players of China
Sportspeople from Tianjin
Softball players at the 2000 Summer Olympics
Softball players at the 2004 Summer Olympics
Asian Games medalists in softball
Softball players at the 1998 Asian Games
Softball players at the 2002 Asian Games
Medalists at the 1998 Asian Games
Medalists at the 2002 Asian Games
Asian Games gold medalists for China
Asian Games silver medalists for China
21st-century Chinese women